Pascal Feindouno (born 27 February 1981) is a Guinean former professional footballer who played as a winger. In his prime, he was widely recognised as one of the best footballers to come out of Guinea. He scored 30 goals in 85 appearances between 1998 and 2012 for the Guinea national team.

Club career

Early career
Born in Conakry, Feindouno began his career with Club Industriel de Kamsar where played for two years before signing with Hirondelles de Conakry in January 1998.

Bordeaux, and Lorient loan
Feindouno started his European career at FC Girondins de Bordeaux in July 1998, and scored the goal which gave the club the Ligue 1 Championship title in 1999. He spent the 2001–02 season on loan at Lorient. Whilst at Lorient Feindouno played in the 2002 Coupe de France Final in which they beat SC Bastia.

Saint-Étienne
Feindouno left Bordeaux to join Saint-Étienne before the 2004–05 season. He missed Guinea's lost quarter final against the Ivory Coast in the 2008 African Nations due to suspension.

In summer 2007 he was linked with a move away from his club, with many sides from all over Europe interested in his services. Feindouno stated his desire to link up with close friend and former Lorient teammate Jean-Claude Darcheville at Scottish side Rangers in May 2007 or in the January transfer window of 2008. On 12 October 2007, it was reported that Premiership club Liverpool's manager Rafael Benítez was to make a bid to sign him in the January transfer window.

Qatar and Saudi Arabia
On 24 September 2008, Feindouno moved to Al Sadd SC of the Qatar National First Division for €7 million, signing a contract for four years. After one year at Al Sadd, he was transferred to Al Rayyan Sports Club on a one-year loan. On 29 January 2010, he moved to Al-Nassr on a three-month loan.

In the summer 2010 transfer window, he reportedly attracted interest from Everton, Blackburn Rovers and Bolton Wanderers but nothing came of it. Celtic were reported to have offered him a contract worth £10,000 a week on 11 December 2010.

Later career
In February 2011, he confirmed that he has signed for Monaco after trials with Celtic and Wigan Athletic.

He left Monaco after their relegation and on 22 June joined Swiss Super League outfit FC Sion, but left in January 2012 after the Swiss Football Association deducted 36 points for fielding ineligible players.

In July 2012, he signed for the Turkish club Elazığspor and his contract was terminated in February 2013, before the end of the 2012–13 season. In April 2013, he returned to Guinea, signing a four-month contract with AS Kaloum Star.

On 30 August 2013, Swiss Super League team Lausanne-Sport announced that Feindouno had agreed to a short-term deal until Christmas Day, with an option to extend for a further year.

In September 2014, Feindouno signed a one-year contract with Moroccan club Hassania Agadir. In February 2015, he agreed the termination of his contract.

In 17 November 2015, Feindouno joined CS Sedan Ardennes, along with his stepson Abdoul Karim Sylla. On 2 December, it was reported that the club's doctor had refused to grant him permission to play football after cardiac tests had shown "abnormalities" in the size of an artery. Two days later, he was linked with a move to Congolese side TP Mazembe.

In May 2016, he moved to Lithuanian side FK Atlantas, again with Abdoul Karim Sylla.

International career
Feindouno was a member of the Guinean national team that competed in the 2004 African Nations Cup, finishing second in their group in the first round of competition, before losing in the quarter finals to Mali. He was the captain of Guinea.

Personal life
Pascal Feindouno's brother is midfielder Simon Feindouno and his other brother Benjamin Feindouno also plays football. His adviser is Rui Pedro Alves. His stepson Abdoul Karim Sylla is a footballer as well.

Career statistics

Club

International
Scores and results list Guinea's goal tally first, score column indicates score after each Feindouno goal.

 (a): Match annulled after Guinea were banned from FIFA competitions due to governmental interference

Honours
Bordeaux
Ligue 1: 1998–99

Lorient
Coupe de France: 2001–02
Coupe de la Ligue runners-up: 2001–02

References

External links
 
 
 
  
 Pascal Feindouno - Goals in International Matches (not yet completed)

1981 births
Living people
Sportspeople from Conakry
Association football wingers
Guinean footballers
Guinean expatriate footballers
Guinea international footballers
2004 African Cup of Nations players
2006 Africa Cup of Nations players
2008 Africa Cup of Nations players
2012 Africa Cup of Nations players
Ligue 1 players
A Lyga players
Swiss Super League players
Süper Lig players
FC Lorient players
FC Girondins de Bordeaux players
AS Saint-Étienne players
Al Sadd SC players
Al-Rayyan SC players
AS Monaco FC players
FC Sion players
Elazığspor footballers
Al Nassr FC players
FC Lausanne-Sport players
FK Atlantas players
Guinean expatriate sportspeople in France
Expatriate footballers in France
Expatriate footballers in Qatar
Expatriate footballers in Monaco
Expatriate footballers in Switzerland
Expatriate footballers in Turkey
Expatriate footballers in Lithuania
Guinean expatriate sportspeople in Turkey
Guinean expatriate sportspeople in Switzerland
Guinean expatriate sportspeople in Lithuania
Qatar Stars League players
Saudi Professional League players